Zonalny is a rural locality (a khutor) in Kirovskoye Rural Settlement, Sredneakhtubinsky District, Volgograd Oblast, Russia. The population was 70 as of 2010. There are 9 streets.

Geography 
Zonalny is located near the Gniloy Erik, 18 km northwest of Srednyaya Akhtuba (the district's administrative centre) by road. Krasny Buksir is the nearest rural locality.

References 

Rural localities in Sredneakhtubinsky District